The Georgia Emergency Management and Homeland Security Agency or GEMHSA is the emergency management agency for the U.S. state of Georgia.  Its function is similar to that of the Federal Emergency Management Agency (FEMA) in preparing for and responding to disasters, and mitigating potential hazards.

External links
GEMHSA official site

Emergency
Emergency management in the United States
Government agencies with year of establishment missing